The 1913–1914 Rugby Union County Championship was the 26th edition of England's premier rugby union club competition at the time.

The Midland Counties won the competition for the first time defeating Durham County in the final.

Draw and results

Semifinals

Final

See also
 English rugby union system
 Rugby union in England

References

Rugby Union County Championship
Rugby Union County Championship
County Championship (rugby union) seasons